The fifth season of the television comedy series Community premiered on January 2, 2014, and concluded on April 17, 2014. The season consists of 13 episodes and aired on NBC on Thursdays at 8:00 pm ET as part of the network's "Comedy Night Done Right". The season features the return of series creator Dan Harmon as showrunner, as well as the exit of cast members Donald Glover and Chevy Chase from the series. John Oliver returned as Ian Duncan after a two-year hiatus. Jonathan Banks made his introduction to the series as Buzz Hickey, a criminology professor. 

NBC announced the series' cancellation in May 2014, but in June 2014, Yahoo! announced it had commissioned the show's sixth and final season to be streamed online on Yahoo! Screen.

Cast

Starring
Joel McHale as Jeff Winger 
Gillian Jacobs as Britta Perry 
Danny Pudi as Abed Nadir 
Yvette Nicole Brown as Shirley Bennett 
Alison Brie as Annie Edison
Donald Glover as Troy Barnes
Jim Rash as Dean Craig Pelton 
Ken Jeong as Ben Chang

Recurring
Jonathan Banks as Professor Buzz Hickey 
John Oliver as Professor Ian Duncan 
Richard Erdman as Leonard Briggs 
Charley Koontz as Neil 
Erik Charles Nielsen as Garrett Lambert 
Dino Stamatopoulos as Alex "Star-Burns" Osbourne 
Danielle Kaplowitz as Vicki Jenkins 
Brie Larson as Rachel 
Luke Youngblood as Magnitude 
Brady Novak as Richie Countee 
Jeremy Scott Johnson as Carl Bladt 
James Michael Connor as the Subway Representative

Guest stars
 Steve Agee as David ("App Development and Condiments")
 Paget Brewster as Debra Chambers ("Analysis of Cork-Based Networking")
 LeVar Burton as himself ("Geothermal Escapism")
 Kevin Corrigan as Professor Sean Garrity ("Introduction to Teaching")
 Chevy Chase as Pierce Hawthorne ("Repilot")
 Rob Corddry as Alan Connor ("Repilot")
 David Cross as Hank Hickey ("Advanced Advanced Dungeons & Dragons")
 Chris Elliott as Russell Borchert ("Basic Sandwich")
 Nathan Fillion as Bob Waite ("Analysis of Cork-Based Networking")
 Ben Folds as Professor Bublitz ("Basic Intergluteal Numismatics")
 Gina Gershon as Devon's wife ("VCR Maintenance and Educational Publishing") 
 Vince Gilligan as Devon ("VCR Maintenance and Educational Publishing")
 Walton Goggins as Mr. Stone ("Cooperative Polygraphy")
 Tim Heidecker as Roger ("App Development and Condiments")
 Mitchell Hurwitz as Koogler ("App Development and Condiments")
 Jen Kirkman as Four ("App Development and Condiments")
 Katie Leclerc as Carol ("Analysis of Cork-Based Networking")
 Michael McDonald as Ronald Mohammad ("Basic Story")
 Jerry Minor as Jerry the Janitor ("Analysis of Cork-Based Networking")
 Dominik Musiol as Pavel Iwaszkiewicz ("VCR Maintenance and Educational Publishing")
 Kumail Nanjiani as Lapari ("Analysis of Cork-Based Networking")
 B. J. Novak as Mr. Egypt ("Basic Sandwich")
 Robert Patrick as Waldron ("Analysis of Cork-Based Networking")
 Eddie Pepitone as Crazy Schmidt ("Analysis of Cork-Based Networking")
 Brian Posehn as Bixel ("App Development and Condiments") 
 Questlove as himself ("Basic Sandwich")
 Amber Tamblyn as herself ("Basic Sandwich")
 Eric Wareheim as Billy ("App Development and Condiments")
 Paul Williams as Britta's Connection ("VCR Maintenance and Educational Publishing")

Episodes

Production
On May 10, 2013, NBC announced it had renewed the series for a fifth season, to consist of 13 episodes. The season does not feature original cast member Chevy Chase in a regular role, as he left the series near the end of the fourth season by mutual agreement between the actor and network. Chase does appear in a guest role during the first episode of the season, and the character's exit from the show is finalized in "Cooperative Polygraphy." Donald Glover, who portrays Troy Barnes, only appears in five of the thirteen episodes. Jonathan Banks appears in 11 of the season's 13 episodes as criminology professor Buzz Hickey. Rob Corddry reprises his role as lawyer Alan Connor in the season premiere. Walton Goggins guest stars in "Cooperative Polygraphy" as a mysterious man named Mr. Stone, "with a dangerous accusation, a tantalizing offer and a devious plan that will change the group forever." John Oliver, who played Professor Duncan throughout the first two seasons, reprises his role in season 5 for multiple episodes. Other guest stars in the season include Vince Gilligan, Mitchell Hurwitz, Tim Heidecker, Eric Wareheim, Brie Larson, Nathan Fillion, Robert Patrick, Paget Brewster, Kumail Nanjiani, Katie Leclerc, and Ben Folds. David Cross guest stars in an episode that serves as a sequel to season 2's "Advanced Dungeons & Dragons", playing Hank Hickey, the estranged son of Professor Hickey. B. J. Novak has a cameo in the second part of the two-part season finale.

Season 5 began shooting on August 19, 2013.

The fifth season marked the return of series creator Dan Harmon as showrunner and executive producer after he was fired from the show after the end of the third season. Former writer-producer Chris McKenna also returned as an executive producer. Season 4 showrunners Moses Port and David Guarascio did not return for season 5, as their contracts were for one year. The only other returning writers are Andy Bobrow and Tim Saccardo. Meanwhile, Annie Mebane, Steve Basilone, Maggie Bandur, and Ben Wexler all departed to join The Michael J. Fox Show, while Megan Ganz joined Modern Family. Writers who joined for the fifth season include Parker Deay and Jordan Blum (American Dad!), Alex Rubens (Key & Peele), Ryan Ridley (Rick and Morty), Dan Guterman (The Colbert Report), and Matt Roller (Funny or Die). Other writers include Carol Kolb, Briggs Hatton, Clay Lapari, Erik Sommers, Monica Padrick and Donald Diego.

Reception
The fifth season received strongly positive reception from television critics and is considered an improvement over the previous season. The season received a Metacritic score of 80 out of 100 based on 15 reviews, signifying "generally favorable reviews". On Rotten Tomatoes, the season has an approval rating of 93% with an average score of 8.5 out of 10 based on 42 reviews. The website's critical consensus reads, "With Dan Harmon back as its show runner, Community returns with a familiar new energy and more fun, exciting adventures for the Greendale gang."

Verne Gay of Newsday gave the back-to-back episodes an "A" grade, remarking that the first of the two ("Repilot") was funny, while the latter ("Introduction to Teaching") was "simply hilarious." Alan Sepinwall, writing for HitFix, remarked that the show "is back, and back to being itself."

DVD release

References

External links
 

Community (TV series) seasons
2014 American television seasons